Gabriella Evelina Quevedo (born 12 January 1997, Kinna, Sweden) is a Swedish guitarist. She grew up in Kinna and developed an interest in guitar because her father played the instrument. Her father is from Argentina and her mother is Argentine-Swedish. In addition to Swedish, she also speaks English and she understands Spanish.

She began playing guitar at age twelve, quickly discovering, and mastering fingerstyle guitar techniques, which led to her recording a number of covers of other guitarists' performances and her own guitar arrangements on YouTube. As of February 2022, Gabriella's YouTube channel had 1.5 million subscribers and 255 million views. Selected covers have also been published in other channels. In July 2018 an album entitled Acoustic Cover Songs Vol. 1 containing 16 songs appeared on Spotify, iTunes, Deezer, Amazon Music, Google Play Music, Tidal, YouTube Music and Apple Music. 
Gabriella's first original songs, "Last Time" and "Remember", were released at the end of 2019. They were recorded at Mono Music studio in Stockholm, established by former ABBA member Benny Andersson.

Quevedo cites her main influences as Tommy Emmanuel, Sungha Jung, Kotaro Oshio and Andy McKee, whose music she has included in her recordings and performance repertoires, and with whom she has appeared in concerts in Sweden and on the international stage.

Her recording of "Hotel California" by the Eagles, arranged by Tomi Paldanius, had over 22 million views on YouTube in July 2019. In 2012 she won first prize in the category of "young talent" on the Uppsala International Guitar Festival and 2014 Ryan Seacrest's vote on the best cover of the song "Young Girls" by Bruno Mars. In 2016 she was awarded the Hagström grant of the Royal Swedish Academy of Music (Kungliga Musikaliska Akademien).

She first learned to play on her father's Yamaha guitar, but later her parents bought Quevedo her own guitar, a "shiny black Yamaha with a cutaway", which is seen in her earlier videos on YouTube, and which was signed by Tommy Emmanuel. She later started playing Taylor Guitars, first a custom Taylor GC8e, then a Taylor 912ce and a custom Taylor 812ce. Quevedo has had commercial arrangements with Taylor Guitars and G7th, The Capo Company.

Concerts 
Gabriella Quevedo has appeared in concerts in Sweden, Norway, Germany, the US and Asia, including:

 with Hansel Pethig, Lemgo, Germany (2012)

 with Sungha Jung, Blomberg, Germany (2012) and Sweden (2014)
 Uppsala International Guitar Festival, Uppsala, Sweden (2012,2014)
 with Tommy Emmanuel, Gothenburg, Sweden (2012,2015)
 Sundsvall Gitarrfestival, Sundsvall, Sweden (2013,2017)
 with Adam Rafferty, Blomberg, Germany (2013)
 Larvik Gitar Festival, Larvik, Norway (2014,2017)
 with Andy McKee, Gothenburg, Sweden (2015)
 Winter NAMM Show, USA (2016)
 concert tour in Japan, South Korea, Taiwan and China (2016)

References

External links

Gabriella Quevedo (official website)

1997 births
Living people
Swedish people of Argentine descent
Swedish guitarists
Fingerstyle guitarists
21st-century guitarists
Swedish YouTubers
Video bloggers
21st-century women guitarists